Latchford is a single-tier municipality town in Timiskaming District in Northeastern Ontario, Canada. It is located on Bay Lake on the Montreal River, near the town of Cobalt and the municipality of Temagami, and is 20 kilometres (13 miles) from the city of Temiskaming Shores. The population of the town in the Canada 2011 Census was 387, which makes it the smallest town by population in Ontario. The town's slogan is "The Best Little Town by a Dam Site!"

History
Latchford was first settled in 1902 when the decision to build the Temiskaming and Northern Ontario Railway (now the Ontario Northland Railway) was struck. It was decided the railway would cross the Montreal River at the location of what is today Latchford, and a bridge was finished in 1904. Hence, the settlement was known first as Montreal River Station. It was renamed Latchford in 1905 in honour of the provincial commissioner of public works, Francis Robert Latchford, and was incorporated as a town on July 15, 1907. A dam that provided hydroelectric power, as well as a vehicle crossing over the river, was built in 1910, and Ontario Highway 11 including a bridge over the river was built finished through the town in 1927. Silver mining, forestry, and later tourism, drove Latchford’s economy throughout the 20th century.

In 2006, the boundaries of the town were expanded to include the South Part of geographic Gillies Limit Township.

A plaque was erected in 2009 commemorating the founding of the town.

Transportation
Latchford has good road links because of Ontario Highway 11, which is part of the Trans-Canada Highway as it passes through the town. Ontario Northland offers a twice-daily bus service north towards Cochrane and south towards North Bay.

Bridges
The Sgt. Aubrey Cosens VC Memorial Bridge, which carries Ontario Highway 11, is the town's most recognized symbol. It was named after a World War II recipient of the Victoria Cross from Latchford. The bridge failed on a cold day in 2003, but was repaired and is again in service. Latchford is also home to the world's shortest covered bridge.

Recreation
W.J.B. Greenwood Provincial Park is in Latchford south of the town centre.

Demographics

Mother tongue (2006 census):
 English as first language: 78.2%
 French as first language: 12.6%
 English and French as first language: 2.3%
 Other as first language: 6.9%

References

Other map sources:

External links

Municipalities in Timiskaming District
Single-tier municipalities in Ontario
Towns in Ontario